Adérito Pires da Mata (born 8 September 1992), known as Tinho, is a Santomean footballer who plays as a midfielder for Porto Real and the São Tomé and Príncipe national team.

International career
Tinho made his professional debut with the São Tomé and Príncipe national team in a 2–0 2018 African Nations Championship qualification loss to Cameroon on 12 August 2017.

References

External links
 
 

1992 births
Living people
People from São Tomé
São Tomé and Príncipe footballers
São Tomé and Príncipe international footballers
Association football midfielders
Sporting Praia Cruz players